Nell Butner Brimberry of Albany, Georgia, became the first Postmistress of a major United States Post Office in 1910. 

In 1911 she inaugurated the first airmail flight in the U.S. and struck the first airmail stamp.  This preceded the first transcontinental airmail flight by nine years. 

She played a significant role in the agricultural history of the South when she secured for pecan growers the privilege of sealing their product in packages to be distributed by mail.

References 
 
 NATIONAL REGISTER OF HISTORIC PLACES INVENTORY - NOMINATION FORM, United States National Park Service

People from Albany, Georgia
Georgia (U.S. state) postmasters
Year of birth missing
Year of death missing